Sir James Harington, 3rd Baronet of Ridlington (30 December 1607 – 1680) was an English Member of Parliament and a Parliamentarian commander during the English Civil War.

Early life
James Harington was the eldest son of Edward Harington of Ridlington and Margaret Doyley. He married Katherine Wright (1617-1675), a daughter of Sir Edmund Wright, Lord Mayor of London, and inherited Swakeleys House from Wright.

Military career
Harrington was Colonel of the Westminster Trained Bands (the Red Regiment) in 1642, and he commanded a London brigade (his own regiment, together with the Green Auxiliary Trained Bands of London and the Tower Hamlets Auxiliaries (the Yellow Regiment)) in Sir William Waller's Parliamentarian army at the Siege of Basing House and Battle of Alton in late 1643. As a Major-General, Harrington led out another brigade of suburban Trained Bands (the Tower Hamlets Regiment, the Southwark White Auxiliaries and the Westminster Yellow Auxiliaries) to join Waller in the campaign that culminated at the Battle of Cropredy Bridge on 29 June 1644. For the great combination of Parliamentary armies in the autumn of 1644, London provided a fresh brigade of five regiments under Harrington. It fought at the Second Battle of Newbury, where Harrington had his horse shot under him.

Political career
He was elected MP for Rutland (1646–1653) and Middlesex (1654–55). Although he did not sign the death warrant, Harrington was one of the Commissioners (Judges) at the trial of Charles I. During the Interregnum, he continued to serve the Parliamentary cause, He served on the first Council of State and later was for a time president of the council. After the Restoration he was exempted from the Indemnity and Oblivion Act which pardoned most for taking up arms against the King in the Civil War, and died in exile on the European mainland. His baronetcy, which he had inherited on his father's death in 1653, was declared forfeited for life in 1661.

See also
Portrait of Katherine Wright, Lady Harington, engraved by William Faithorne, Fitzwilliam Museum
Baronet Ridlington
James Harrington, the author of Oceana, a cousin often confused with this man.

Notes

References
 John Adair, Cheriton 1644: The Campaign and the Battle, Kineton: Roundwood, 1973, ISBN 0-900093-19-6.
 Lt-Col Alfred H. Burne & Lt-Col Peter Young, The Great Civil War: A Military History of the First Civil War 1642–1646, London: Eyre & Spottiswoode, 1959/Moreton-in-Marsh, Windrush Press, 1998, ISBN 1-900624-22-2.
 Lawson Chase Nagel, The Militia of London, 1641–1649, PhD thesis, King's College London, 1982.
 Stuart Reid, All the King's Armies: A Military History of the English Civil War 164–1651, Staplehurst: Spelmount, 1998, ISBN 1-86227-028-7.
 Keith Roberts, London And Liberty: Ensigns of the London Trained Bands, Eastwood, Nottinghamshire: Partizan Press, 1987, ISBN 0-946525-16-1.
 John Taplin Shakespeare's Granddaughter and the Bagleys of Dudley published by the Black Country Society June 2005 (Originally published in 38/4, 39/1 and 39/2 of The Blackcountryman).
 Margaret Toynbee & Brig Peter Young, Cropredy Bridge, 1644: The Campaign and the Battle, Kineton: Roundwood, 1970, ISBN 0-900093-17-X.
 Civil War at UK Battlefields Resource Centre

Further reading
Ian Grimble's The Harington Family published by Jonathan Cape, London 1957

|-

1607 births
1680 deaths
Baronets in the Baronetage of England
Roundheads
London Trained Bands officers
Middlesex Militia officers
Regicides of Charles I
English MPs 1640–1648
English MPs 1648–1653
People from Rutland
James